Valley Stream School District may refer to one of several related school districts in Nassau County, New York, USA.

Elementary school districts
Valley Stream 13 Union Free School District
Valley Stream 24 Union Free School District
Valley Stream 30 Union Free School District

Secondary school district
Valley Stream Central High School District